John Sims (born 14 August 1952 in Belper, Derbyshire) is an English former professional footballer, he played predominantly as a forward for Plymouth Argyle, and briefly managed Torquay United.

References

External links
John Sims, Post War English & Scottish Football League A – Z Player's Transfer Database

1952 births
Living people
People from Belper
Footballers from Derbyshire
Association football forwards
English footballers
Derby County F.C. players
Luton Town F.C. players
Oxford United F.C. players
Colchester United F.C. players
Notts County F.C. players
Exeter City F.C. players
Plymouth Argyle F.C. players
Torquay United F.C. players
English football managers
Torquay United F.C. managers
Saltash United F.C. players